Kopice  (German: Koppitz, 1936–1945 Schwarzengrund) is a village in the administrative district of Gmina Grodków, within Brzeg County, Opole Voivodeship, in south-western Poland.

The Schaffgotsch noble family left a Neo-Gothic palace, today in ruins.

The village has a population of 1,200.

References

External links
 Kopice palace
 Photo gallery

Kopice
Palaces in Poland